{{DISPLAYTITLE:Kappa1 Ceti}}

Kappa1 Ceti, Latinized from κ1 Ceti, is a variable yellow dwarf star approximately 30 light-years away in the equatorial constellation of Cetus.

The star was discovered to have a rapid rotation, roughly once every nine days. Though there are no extrasolar planets confirmed to be orbiting the star, Kappa1 Ceti is considered a good candidate to contain terrestrial planets, like the Earth. The system is a candidate binary star, but has not been confirmed.

Description 

Kappa1 Ceti is a yellow dwarf star of the spectral type G5Vv. Since 1943, the spectrum of this star has served as one of the stable anchor points by which other stars are classified. The star has roughly the same mass as the Sun, with 95% of the Sun's radius but only 85 percent of the luminosity.  Its brightness varies by a few hundredths of a magnitude over a period of nine days and it is classified as a BY Draconis variable, a type of variable star where the brightness changes are due to spots on its surface as it rotates.

The rapid rotation rate of this star, approximately once every nine days, is indicative of a relatively youthful body several hundred million years in age. Due to starspots, the star varies slightly over approximately the same period. The variations in the period are thought to be caused by differential rotation at various latitudes, similar to what happens on the surface of the Sun. The starspots on Kappa1 Ceti range in latitude from 10° to 75° The magnetic properties of this star make it "an excellent match for the Sun at a key point in the Earth's past".

According to recent hypotheses, unusually intense stellar flares from a solar twin star could be caused by the interaction of the magnetic field of a giant planet in a tight orbit with that star's own magnetic field. Some Sun-like stars of spectral class F8 to G8 have been found to undergo enormous magnetic outbursts to produce so-called superflares (coronal mass ejections) that release between 100 and 10 million times more energy than the largest flares ever observed on the sun, making them brighten briefly by up to 20 times.

Magnetic field measurements for κ1 Cet were reported in 2016. These authors used spectropolarimetric observations from NARVAL to reconstruct the magnetic field topology and to quantitatively investigate the interactions between the stellar wind and a possible surrounding planetary system.  A magnetic field detection was reported for κ1 Cet.,  with an average field strength of 24 G, and a maximum value of 61 G. Stellar wind model  shows a mass-loss rate of
·yr−1, i.e., 50 times larger than the current solar wind mass-loss rate. Recent data constrained model of the star suggests that its mass loss rate is as high as 100 times of the solar mass-loss rate.

The space velocity components of this star are  = . It is not known to be a member of a moving group of stars.

See also
 List of star systems within 25–30 light-years

References

External links 

 
 
 

G-type main-sequence stars
Ceti, 96

Cetus (constellation)
Ceti, Kappa1
Durchmusterung objects
Ceti, 96
0137
020630
015457
0996